Aversion means opposition or repugnance. The following are different forms of aversion:

 Ambiguity aversion
 Brand aversion
 Dissent aversion in the United States of America
 Endowment effect, also known as divestiture aversion
 Inequity aversion
 Loss aversion
 Risk aversion
 Taste aversion
 Work aversion

Aversion may also refer to:
 Aversion therapy
 Aversion (film)
 Dvesha (Buddhism), a Buddhist term that translates to aversion